Henry Brandon may refer to:

 Henry Brandon, 1st Earl of Lincoln (1523–1534)
 Henry Brandon, 2nd Duke of Suffolk (1535–1551)
 Henry Brandon (actor) (1912–1990), American character actor
 Henry Brandon, Baron Brandon of Oakbrook (1920–1999), British life peer
 Henry Brandon (journalist) (1916–1993), Czech-born British journalist
 Henry L. Brandon (1923–1997), American attorney

See also
 Harry "Skip" Brandon (born 1941), former deputy assistant director in charge of counter-terrorism and national security at the Federal Bureau of Investigation
 Harry Brandon (footballer) (1870–1935), Scottish footballer